Molvom Railway Station coded MLVOM is a railway station currently under construction at Molvom in the Chümoukedima District of the Indian state of Nagaland. It will be the second railway station after Shokhuvi Railway Station on the Dhansiri–Zubza line.

See also 
 Dhansiri–Zubza line
 Kohima Zubza Railway Station

References 

Lumding railway division
Railway stations in Nagaland
Transport in Chümoukedima
Railway stations under construction